The 12th Infantry Division was a division of the Korean People's Army during the 20th century. Originally, it was the 156th Division, which was created in November 1948 under the Regulation of the Redesignations of All Organizations and Units of the Army, issued by Central Military Commission on November 1, 1948, basing on the 6th Independent Division, PLA Northeastern Field Army.

PLA Period

The 156th Division was a Korean-Chinese unit, composing of both Chinese and Korean soldiers and formed part of 43rd Corps. Under the flag of 156th division it took part in the Chinese Civil War. On June 25, 1949, the division was disbanded and reorganized as Jiujiang and Nanchang military sub-district. In February 1950, all Korean soldiers from 156th Division regrouped in Nanchang and moved to North Korea, where it was re-organized as 7th Division(later 12th Division) of the Korean People's Army. Its divisional HQ was re-organized as HQ, 2nd Forestry Engineering Division.

As of disbandment division was composed of:
466th Regiment (mostly Korean);
467th Regiment (basically Korean);
468th Regiment (basically Chinese).

North Korea Period 
It was activated in Wonsan and was initially composed of Korean-personnel regiments of the PLA 156th Division and was initially composed of the 30th, 31st and 32nd Infantry Regiments. The unit was initially equipped with vehicles transferred to North Korea from the Soviet Union shortly after April 1950.

In April 1950, the People's Republic of China returned 12,000 more veterans of the PVA to Korea where they formed the 7th Division (redesignated the 12th about July 2, 1950).

Artillery units of the 12th Division, at the time of the division's activation at Wonsan in April or May 1950, were composed of battle-seasoned Korean veterans from the Chinese People's Liberation Army.

Korean War 
The 12th Division part of the North Korean advance from Seoul to Taejon during the Korean War. It also fought in the Battle of Pusan Perimeter. During this fight it suffered such heavy losses it merged with the NK 766th Infantry Regiment to regain its strength.

On September 16, in the I Corps sector, elements of the Capital Division fought their way through the streets of An'gang-ni. The next day, advancing from the west in the II Corps sector, a battalion of the ROK 7th Division linked up with elements of the Capital Division, closing a two-week-old gap between the ROK I and II Corps. The NKPA's 12th Division waged a series of stubborn delaying actions against the Capital Division in the vicinity of Kigye as the North Koreans retreated northward into the mountains. Kigye fell back under South Korean control on September 22, 1950.

In 2009 the location of the 7th Division was reported as Anbyeong-gun (Anbyon County), Kangwon Province.

References

中国人民解放军各步兵师沿革，http://blog.sina.com.cn/s/blog_a3f74a990101cp1q.html
广东省地方史志编纂委员会．《广东省志·农垦志》．中国广州：广东人民出版社，1993年6月：11

Infantry divisions of the People's Liberation Army
Military units and formations established in 1948
Military units and formations disestablished in 1949
InfDiv0012
InfDiv0012NK